War with the Robots (pub: 1962) is a collection of science fiction stories, written by Harry Harrison in 1956–1961. The collection is tied together by a central theme of robots being able to do things better than humans.

The collection includes the short stories:
"Simulated Trainer"
"The Velvet Glove"
"Arm of the Law"
"The Robot Who Wanted to Know"
"I See You"
"The Repairman"
"Survival Planet"
"War with the Robots"

References

 

1962 short story collections
Short story collections by Harry Harrison
Science fiction short story collections
Robots in literature
Pyramid Books books